Evergreen Cemetery is a historic African-American cemetery in the East End of Richmond, Virginia, dating from 1891.

The most recent burial in the historic section of the cemetery dates from the 1980s. Much of the privately owned cemetery had completely overgrown with kudzu or is returning to forest until the late 2010's. The original organization responsible for the cemetery, the Evergreen Cemetery Association, made no allowances for perpetual care in its charter. However, in recent years (2019–2022) community efforts have made noticeable progress in cleaning. In 1970, the association sold its more than 5,000 plots to Metropolitan Memorial Services, which soon went bankrupt. A group of black funeral-home directors later bought the site at auction.

Notable burials
 Rev. John Andrew Bowler (1862–1935), educator
 John Mitchell, Jr. (1863–1929), civil rights pioneer
 Maggie L. Walker (1867–1934), businesswoman

References

Further reading

External links
 
 
 Evergreen Cemetery Families and Friends
 Evergreen Cemetery (Richmond, Virginia) Flickr Group
 Evergreen Cemetery on Historic Cemeteries 

Cemeteries in Richmond, Virginia
African-American cemeteries in Virginia
African-American history in Richmond, Virginia